The Holly Motor Company of Mount Holly, New Jersey was an automaker founded in 1913 from the leftovers of the Otto Gas Engine Company.

History
In 1911, the Otto Gas Engine company went bankrupt, and from it, the Holly Motor Company was created. The company produced its Holly Six car as either a 5, 6, or 7-passenger touring car or a 2-passenger roadster.

The company went out of business in 1915 due to poor sales.

Models

References

Mount Holly, New Jersey
Defunct motor vehicle manufacturers of the United States